Champaner-Pavagadh Archaeological Park, a UNESCO World Heritage Site, is located in Panchmahal district in Gujarat, India. It is located around the historical city of Champaner, a city which was founded by Vanraj Chavda, the most prominent king of the Chavda Dynasty, in the eighth century. He named it after the name of his friend and general Champa, also known later as Champaraj. The heritage site is studded with forts with bastions starting from the hills of Pavagadh, and extending into the city of Champaner. The park's landscape includes archaeological, historic and living cultural heritage monuments such as chalcolithic sites, a hill fortress of an early Hindu capital, and remains of the 16th-century capital of the state of Gujarat. There are palaces, entrance gates and arches, mosques, tombs and temples, residential complexes, agricultural structures and water installations such as stepwells and tanks, dating from the eighth to the 14th centuries.

The transition between Hindu and Muslim culture and architecture in the late 15th to early 16th century is documented in the park, particularly the early Islamic and pre-Mughal city that has remained without any change. It was inscribed by UNESCO as a World Heritage Site in 2004.

Geography 

It includes the Palace of Mahmud Begada, grandson of Ahmed Shah, who founded Ahmedabad City, Jama Masjid and other mosques. The setting is undulating hillocks and plateaus. There are steep rock exposures formed by ancient volcanic eruptions and lava flows.

The highest point of the hill presents an undulating forested topography in the direction of Jambughoda. The Pavagadh Hill has a historical fort where the ancient Kalika Mata Temple is situated. The path to the summit passes through many old gates and cuts through staircase-like natural ledges of rock with precipitous sides. Midway up this path is a flat area strewn with boulders. Above this point there is a very steep scarp with a marble temple and two lantern towers.

History

Early history
Judging by early archaeological remains and according to records, the area had already been inhabited in the chalcolithic period; however, it remained neglected until approximately 400 AD. The history also reports a local legend that the divinity of the hills was derived from the right toe of the goddess Kalika, which had apparently fallen on the hill.

Champaner is named after Champa Bhil, a last Bhil king of Champaner. Champa Bhil built Champaner Fort  He also established this city during the rule of Vanraj Chavda of Anhilwad Patan (from 746 to 806 AD). In the eleventh century, Ram Gaur Tuar ruled, and Champaner was under the Anhilwad until 1297 or so when they were defeated by Alauddin Khalji, who made it their stronghold. During this period, the  Chauhan Rajput had also settled in Champaner. The Pavagadh Hill was where the Solanki kings and Khichi Chauhans built fortresses and ruled from. However, they lost their authority in Champaner in 1484.

In 1418 and in about 1450, Khichis managed to fight off their neighbour, Rao of Idar, and the Muslim rulers of Ahmedabad, thanks to the protection provided by the hill. However, in 1483, when Mahmud Begada's captain, Malik Asad, was raiding through Champaner, he was attacked and killed by Raval Jaisingh.  What ensued in the following years was the complete defeat of the Rajputs by Sultan Begada. The hill was surrounded and the fort held under siege for more than a year and was finally captured on 17 November 1484, when Kivamul Mulk and Malik Ayaz Sultani penetrated the walls and broke the main gate, destroyed the army and injured the leaders of the Rajput . Raval Jaisingh was wounded and for six months was given amnesty but was then killed since he refused to convert to Islam.

Raval's son, however, converted to Islam and was made a noble with the title "Nizam-ul-Mulk". After the fort was seized, Mahmud renamed the city "Muhmudabad Champaner". It was during this period that Mahmud laid the foundation stone for his mosque. He built elaborate ornate structures, fortified both the forts, made the hill fort his Mauliya (meaning Lord of the Hill) and his citadel over a period of 23 years and eventually moved his capital from Ahmadabad to Champaner.

During this period, Champaner was famous for mangoes, sandalwood trees (used then for house building and sword blades), and colourful silks. Merchants and craftsmen prospered. Mahmud died in 1511 and his successors continued to rule from Champaner until the death of Bahadur Shah (1536). The city of Champaner had been very well planned with streets and whitewashed stone houses. In 1526, young Sikander Shah died and Bahadur Shah became the next ruler of Champaner. In 1535, the Mughal Emperor Humayun invaded Champaner and looted the coffers. Upon Bahadur's death in 1536, the capital and the court shifted back to Ahmadabad. The city fell into rapid decline, was largely abandoned and for several centuries was neglected and almost deserted.

Later history

The British visited the town of Champaner in 1803, at which time there were only 500 people residing there. The old city was in ruins and wildly overgrown. They re-founded it and it became a great exporter of silk, with facilities for washing and preparing raw silk. However, a cholera epidemic reduced the population to 400 families by 1812. When the British finally usurped the area on 13 July 1829, it was almost deserted; efforts at that time to populate the place by inducting cultivators with an incentive of Rs 1260 to develop the lands at that time also failed. In 1879, a few Bhil and Naikda tribes resided there, but over the next few years, it became well known in India for its rulers and the monuments left behind by them

In the last decade the site has received attention by archaeologists and Heritage Trusts working in the area to develop it into a tourist attraction and a World Heritage Site. The Baroda Heritage Trust took the initiative in this direction and carried out a landscape study of the former urban centre. A Master Plan for an archaeological park was developed for Champaner City and Pavagarh as a cultural sanctuary, and the Archaeological Survey of India, supported by the Baroda Heritage Trust, submitted a proposal to UNESCO to declare the site a World Heritage Site. In July 2004, UNESCO approved the proposal and inscribed the site on the World Heritage List with the justification of its "joint significance as a living Hindu pilgrimage center, its cluster of Jain temples, its remarkable preserved medieval urban fabric, its exquisite sandstone-carved mosques and tombs and its intangible heritage values". Tourism in the area was affected by the Godhra Hindu-Muslim riots, resulting in conflicting interests in developing infrastructure such as roads, ropeway and accommodation facilities for the pilgrims and tourists visiting the various monuments in this site.

City planning 
Remaining at the site are the Royal precincts within fortified walls, the entrance gate or the city gate, the mosque outside the fortifications, the royal walkway leading into the palace, and the second enclosure consisting of unexplored Jahanpanah. The urban planning of the city reveals well laid and paved streets which lead to the city centre. The residential area consists of houses of both rich and poor; rich people's houses are built with scenic gardens and water channels. Public parks and pavilions surround the housing complex. However, temples, mosques, and tombs are mostly concentrated in the Pavagarh Hills. The walk up the hill from the plains is called the Patha (pilgrim's route); considered to be the "soul of Champaner", it has thousands of steps and is embellished with ornamental and essential structures.

Rainwater harvesting
One of the innovative features of the two historic monuments centres was the development of methods for harvesting rainwater, in the form of tanks or ponds in the Pavagadh hills (called the "hill of hundred pools") and innumerable wells in the city of Champaran, which was nicknamed "city of thousand wells". The Vishamitri River is the only stream that rises from the Pavgadh hills, and was tapped for feeding wells in Champaner and tanks in Pavagadh. The tanks served the pilgrims and other utilitarian, recreational, spiritual and aesthetic needs. Some of the tanks were built by constructing embankments and diverting the stored water into stone cisterns. Some of the famous water structures are: the Ganga, Yamuna and Saraswathi Kunds (in the Mauliya plateau); the Wada Talao, the largest water tank fed by rivulets located on the eastern part of the city; the innovative Gaben Shah tank; the exquisitely ornamented helical stepwells such as in the public gardens and at the entrance to the city, and the Royal summer pavilions. The water channel in the house of a noble, called the "Amir’s Manzil", is cited as a reflection of the "superb workmanship of water structures built by those responsible for the palatine and religious architecture of Champaner".

Monuments 

There are eleven different types of buildings at Champaner-Pavagadh, including mosques, temples, granaries, tombs, wells, walls, and terraces. The monuments are situated at the foot of and around the Pavagadh hill. The Heritage Trust of Baroda lists 114 monuments in the area, of which only 39 monuments are maintained by the Archaeological Survey of India, due to limited funding. The Forest Department owns 94% of the land here, while the temple trusts and other sectarian establishments provide facilities for boarding and lodging to the pilgrims and tourists. On the southern side near the foot of the hill some dilapidated houses and the foundations of Jain temples can also be seen.

The monuments include:

Champaner
 Helical stepped well
 Sakar Khan's Dargah
 City Gate near Kasbin Talao
 Citadel walls
 City walls at south-east corner of the citadel going up the hill
 East and South Bhadra Gates
 Sahar ki Masjid (Bohrani)
 Three cells inside the citadel wall between Sahar ki Masjid the local fund Dharmashala
 Mandvi or Custom House
 Jami Masjid
 Stepwell north of Jama Masjid
 Kevda Masjid and Cenotaph
 Tomb with a big dome in the centre and small corner domes on way to Khajuri Masjid near Wada Talao
 Cenotaph of Kevda Masjid
 Nagina Masjid
 Cenotaph of Nagina Masjid
 Lila Gumbaz ki Masjid, Chapaner
 Kabutarkhana Pavilion on the north bank of Wada Talao near Khajuri Masjid
 Kamani Masjid
 Bawaman Mosque

Pavagad hill
 Gate No. 1 on Pavagarh hill (Atak Gate)
 Gate No. 2 (with three gateways, Budhiya gate)
 Gate No. 3 (Moti gate, Sadanshah-Gate)
 Gate No. 4 with big bastion with cells in the interior
 Sat Manzil between gate Nos. 4 and 5 right up to bastions on top
 Mint above Gate No4
 Gate No. 5 near Machi (Gulan Bulan Gate)
 Gate No. 6 (Buland Darwaza)
 Makai Kothar
 Palace of Patai Rawal with tanks
 Gate No. 7 near iron bridge (Makai Gate)
 Gate No. 8 (Tarapore Gate)
 The fort of Pavagad and ruined Hindu and Jain temples on the top of Pavagad hills
 Navlakha Kothar
 Walls of fort on top

Fortresses and walls 

The fortress built by the Solanki kings of Gujarat was further fortified by Khichi Chauhans. In 1484, Sultan Mahmud Begadah captured the fort and renamed it Muhammadabad Champaner. The fortifications start on the Mauliya plateau, which is situated on the hill and ends on the plains. They are very large and are built with sandstone walls connected with bastions at intervals and have elegant balconies. There are several gates in the fortifications and the enclosed area within also have barracks and jails. The west gate has fortifications running from the ridge to the north built of brick and cement, followed by a freely laid stone wall for about a mile, then followed by a second line of old wall (of  height) which extends  and rises to join the first line (known as atak) of fortifications on the hill. A rectangular building at the approach to the citadel is a guard room of size x1 with double gates, which has windows made of stone that are embellished with intricate carvings. Shikari Kot or Hunters Fort is located to the east of the Citadel. The Bada Talao or the Great Lake is next to the ruins of the palace.

Temples 
The earliest temple on Pavagadh hill in the Mauliya plateau is dated to the 10th–11th century and is dedicated to Lakulish. However, the temple is in ruins, with only the gudha mandapa (sanctum sanctorum) and Ardha mandapa part of the antarala now present. Lakulish, Dakshinmurthi, Brahma, Vishnu, Gajendramoksha, various forms of Shiva, Indra, seated Ambika and Surasundaris are the images seen in this temple. The temple was built in the Hindu temple architecture style of architecture with garbhagriha, mandapa and an entrance porch. It had ornate decorations, mostly consisting of stone carvings. While this oldest temple is in a dilapidated condition and not in use, all the other temples are used as places of worship. They have ornate decorations, mostly stone carvings.

The temples of the Jain religion at Pavagadh are also noteworthy. They are of three different groups: The first consists of the Bhavanaderi temples near Naqqarkhana gate called the Navalakka temples, the second group is in honour of the Tirthankaras Suparshvanatha and Chandraprabha and the third group, situated on the southeast of Pavagarh Hill (Mataji's cliff), is near the Pārśva temple next to the Dudhia tank. These temples are deduced to have been constructed in the 14th–15th centuries on the basis of "[their] stylistic and architectural features". Elaborately carved seated and standing images of the Jain pantheon are seen on the outer walls of the temples. The Garbabrihas are enshrined with beautiful stone images of Tirthankaras in these temples. All the temples have been renovated over time.

The most visited temple on the hill is the Kalika Mata Temple. It has three images of goddesses: the central image is of Kalika Mata, flanked by Kali on the right and Bahuchara Mata on the left. The spire of this temple carries a shrine of Sadanandsha pir, a Muslim saint held in great reverence in the region. It is the third of the major Shakti Peethas of Gujarat and is known for tantric worship. It is connected by a mono-cable ropeway  in length which can carry 1200 people per hour and is stated to be the country's highest ropeway. On Chaitra ashtami, during navratri (nine-day festival), a fair is held at the Kalika Mata temple which is attended by thousands of devotees. The ruins of Patai Raval's palace can be seen on the way to the temple.

Mosques 

Among the five mosques in very good condition, the Jami Masjid (also spelled "Jama Masjid") near the east gate, built by Sultan Begada, is one of the most notable among the 114 monuments listed by the Baroda Heritage Trust. It has a blend of Hindu and Muslim architecture preserving the Islamic ethos and with its elegant interiors is considered one of the finest mosques in Western India. The Mughal architecture is said to have drawn from the architecture of the Sultanates, which is a blend of Hindu religious connotations and workmanship with Muslim ethos; the large domes are indicative of such a mix. In the Jami Masjid, the ornamentation of the surface areas of the mosque and tomb consists of symbols of motifs of the Sun, diamonds, pots and vines, and lotus insignia which were used in the earlier temples. This mosque has three mural plaques, in oblong shape, one at the top of the pulpit and the other two on the sides with engravings of hymns from the Koran. Of the two minarets, one was damaged by an intentional gun firing in 1812 by Patankar, a Scindia Governor.

Tombs have been built adjacent to mosques, invariably to a square plan with columns and domes erected over them, and also embellished with decorations. The tomb of Sikander Shah seen near Halol is a simple single storied building in Muslim architectural style. The shrine of Khon pir, a saint, a colourful tomb, was a place of worship of the weaver community (Muslims known as Tais) of Champaner.

Palaces 

The custom house was probably used as a guard room. It is well planned in a square shape with five rows of arches and five equal colonnaded aisles. From this location to the east gate, the view of present-day Champaner consists of shabby houses on a lone street. Kabutarkhana Pavilion is situated on the north bank of Bada Talao near Khajuri Masjid. Another building with columns is also located on the Pavagadh Hill, above the roof of the Mahakali temple.

References

Bibliography

External links 

 UNESCO Fact Sheet
 A forgotten city -  Champaner Pavagadh Archaeological Park
 Photos of Champaner

 
History of Gujarat
World Heritage Sites in India
Tourist attractions in Gujarat
Archaeological sites in Gujarat
Archaeological parks
Geography of Gujarat